Lightsleeper, released 24 August 2018 is the first collaborative album by New Zealand father and son duo Neil Finn and Liam Finn.

The album includes the track "Hold Her Close", gifted by the Finns to New Zealand Prime Minister Jacinda Ardern on the occasion of the birth of Arden's first child.

Critical reception
Reviewing the album in The New Zealand Herald, Karl Puschmann wrote: "Each song is filled with little sonic details that are gradually revealed and melodies that take sudden turns to catch you off guard, but never sound anything less than completely natural and effortless." His verdict on the album was "Move aside Lennon/McCartney, we've got Finn/Finn."

Singles
"Ghosts/Hold Her Close" and "Back to Life" were released as singles before the release of the album.

Track listing
All songs were written by Neil Finn and Liam Finn, except where noted.

The 12-inch double vinyl features the additional track "Troubles"

Personnel
 Neil Finn – vocals (tracks 1–10), piano (tracks 2–10), Wurlitzer (tracks 3–4, 10), acoustic guitar (tracks 7–8 and 10), electric guitar (tracks 3 and 7), bass (tracks 7, 9–10), ARP Strings (track 4), synth (tracks 1–3, 6–7, 11), slide guitar (track 7), Mellotron (track 10), beats (track 1), drum synthesizer (track 5), Drums (track 3 (3rd movement only))
 Liam Finn – vocals (all tracks), electric guitar (tracks 2–5, 7, 9–10), bass (track 3, 5–8), beats (track 3, 6–7), drums (tracks 4 (4th movement only), 9), acoustic guitar (tracks 4, 8, 10–11), synth (tracks 4, 6–8, 11), sound effects (tracks 5, 8, 10), samples (track 5), loops (track 10)
 Elroy Finn – drums (tracks 2, 7), percussion (track 3), slide guitar (track 10)
 Sharon Finn – bass (tracks 2, 10), vocals (track 9)
 Mick Fleetwood – drums (tracks 4, 6 and 10), percussion (track 6)
 Connan Mockasin – electric guitar (tracks 2–3, 6), choir (tracks 1, 7)
 Elias Dendias – bouzouki (track 7)
 Spiros Anemogianis – accordion (track 7)
 Barnes Family – choir (tracks 1, 7)
 Devo Finns – choir (tracks 1, 7)
 Jimmy Metherrell – choir (tracks 1, 7)
 Elliot Finn – vocals (track 2)
 Harper Finn – whisper (track 2)
 Matthew Eccles – percussion (track 2)
 Kody Nielson – drums (track 3 (2nd movement only))
 Victoria Kelly – string arrangements (tracks 3, 8, 11)

Charts

References 

2018 albums
Neil Finn albums
Liam Finn albums
Inertia (independent record company) albums
PIAS Recordings albums
Albums recorded at Roundhead Studios